Shali (Şela) is a town and the administrative center of Shalinsky District of the Chechen Republic, Russia. Population:

History
Sheikh Mansur was based here in 1786.

Killed civilians during modern warfare (1994—present days) 

On January 3, 1995, during the course of the First Chechen War, Shali was repeatedly bombed with cluster bombs by Russian jet aircraft.

War journalist Anna Politkovskaya said that on January 9 and 10, 2000, when Russian forces chased terrorists, dozen of civilians were killed by a missile and mortar shelling in Shali.

Climate
Shali has a humid continental climate (Köppen climate classification: Dfa).

Administrative and municipal status
Within the framework of administrative divisions, Shali serves as the administrative center of Shalinsky District. As an administrative division, it is incorporated within Shalinsky District as Shali Town Administration. As a municipal division, Shali Town Administration is incorporated within Shalinsky Municipal District as Shalinskoye Urban Settlement.

References

Notes

Sources

Cities and towns in Chechnya